The telecommunications and postal services market in Greece is regulated by the Hellenic Telecommunications and Post Commission (EETT).

Landline telephone

COSMOTE, the former state monopoly, is the main player in fixed-line telephony. Since the liberalization of the telecommunications market, COSMOTE (OTE) has been slowly losing market share to "alternative", competing telecom operators, such as Vodafone, Nova (Wind). As of 2005, COSMOTE's share on the market hovered around 76%.

Telephones – main lines in use: 6,348,800 (2004).

Telephone system:
modern networks reach all areas; microwave radio relay carries most traffic; 35,000 kilometers of optical fibers and extensive open-wire network; submarine cables to off-shore islands.
domestic: 100% digital; microwave radio relay, open wire, and submarine cable.
international: 100% digital; tropospheric scatter; 8 submarine cables; satellite earth stations – 2 Intelsat (1 Atlantic Ocean and 1 Indian Ocean), 1 Eutelsat, and 1 Inmarsat (Indian Ocean region).

Cellular network
Greece has three mobile telecom companies; Cosmote, Vodafone and WIND.

Number of active lines: 20,285,000 (September 2009), which means 180% penetration.

Satellite
Greece owns one telecommunications satellite, named Hellas Sat, which provides telecommunication services in a major part of Eastern Europe and Western Asia.

Internet

4,893,840 IP addresses, 1.6638e+30 IPv6 addresses, 5,920,000 Internet Users,
2,396,700 broadband connections,
23 Internet Service Providers.

Mass media
Radio broadcast stations:

The state radio and television broadcasting agency is ERT (Elliniki Radiofonia kai Tileorasi – Greek Radio & Television). The station owns 3 national television stations, ERT1, ERT2 and ERT3 which is based out of Thessaloniki. In January 2006, ERT launched digital terrestrial television with 3 channels. By March 2006, at least 65% of the Greek population was able to view Digital TV for free with the use of set-top boxes. ERT also operates 7 national radio stations, including the Voice of Greece, which broadcasts internationally via shortwave. ERT is based in Athens.

The first non-pirate private radio station to broadcast in Greece was Athens 98.4 FM, in 1987. Private television began in November 1989, when Mega Channel began operating. Today, over 1,000 radio stations and approximately 150 television stations broadcast in Greece. Digital satellite broadcasting began in 1999 by the South-African conglomerate Naspers which uses the trademark Nova.

The Broadcasting Media in Greece is considerably free and fair. Established state-run and commercial TV networks broadcast nationally and compete actively against each other, and hundreds of thousands of viewers subscribe to satellite pay-TV services. Domestically made variety programmes, comedies and game shows dominate the peak-time TV schedules and are highly popular and widely shown in Greece.

Main television stations in Greece
Private: Mega Channel, ANT1, Star Channel, Alpha TV, Open TV, Makedonia TV, Skai TV and several other regional and local stations.

Public: ΕΡΤ1, ΕΡΤ2 and ΕΡΤ3 (Hellenic Broadcasting Corporation).

Further Information
Radios: 5.02 million (1997)
Television broadcast stations: 64 (plus about 1,000 low-power repeaters); also two stations in the US Armed Forces Network (1999)
Televisions: 2.54 million (1997)

Mail
Hellenic Post is the state-owned postal service provider of Greece. A number of private courier services, such as DHL, ACS, United Parcel Service and FedEx (Speedex), also operate in Greece.

See also
Economy of Greece
OTE
Hellenic Telecommunications and Post Commission

References

Telecommunications in Greece